Ludvík Kundera (17 August 1891 in Brno – 12 May 1971 in Brno) was a Czechoslovak musicologist, pianist and academic administrator.

Biography 
Kundera was born in Brno, Královo Pole as the youngest of seven siblings in a family which supported his passion for music from early childhood. He studied at German gymnasium and piano playing under Klotylda Schäfrová. His first public performance took place in 1912, with compositions by Johann Sebastian Bach, Robert Schumann, Bedřich Smetana and Franz Liszt.

During World War I, he served in the Czechoslovak Legion. He enlisted on 14 July 1914 and was assigned to the 8th Infantry Regiment operating in Sibiu, Transylvania. He was captured by Russians in 1915 and on 1 August 1916 he joined the Czechoslovak Legion in Russia. During his stay in Russia, he became familiar with the cultural life of the country and occasionally he organized and performed on public concertos. In June, 1920, he travelled from Vladivostok to Terst and later back to the Czechoslovakia.

In 1925, he attended the masterclasses of Alfred Cortot at the École Normale de Musique in Paris. He also continued his studies in Vienna and Prague and earned a doctorate in musicology from Brno University in 1925. He taught at Brno Conservatory from 1922 to 1941 (until his removal by the Nazi authorities occupying Czechoslovakia) and at Brno Academy JAMU from 1948 to 1950. From 1945 to 1946 he was directory of the Brno Conservatory. From 1946 to 1948 he was head of the music department of the Education Faculty of the Charles University in Prague. He was rector of JAMU from 1 October 1948 until his retirement in 1962. As a pianist he concertized widely both at home and abroad, performing both as a soloist and in chamber music groups and often promoting the music of Czech composers. As a musicologist he is perhaps best known for his analyses of the works of Leoš Janáček. He was the father of the writer Milan Kundera and uncle of the writer Ludvík Kundera.

He died in Brno on 12 May 1971. His funeral was accompanied by the String Quartet No. 2 "Intimate Letters" by Leoš Janáček.

Publications 
Richarda Wagnera “Tristan und Isolde”, HR, vi (1912–13), 233–41
O muzïke chekhoslovatskego naroda [Music of the Czechoslovak nation] (Yekaterinburg, 1919)
Hudba v Sovětském Rusku [Music in Soviet Russia], Hudební rozhledy, i (1924–5), 24–6
Janáčkův klavírní sloh [Janáček's piano style], Hudební rozhledy, i (1924–5), 42–5
O estetice umělěcké a zvláště hudební reprodukce [The aesthetics of artistic, and in particular, musical reproduction] (diss., U. of Brno, 1925)
Janáčkova “Věc Makropulos”, HRo, iii (1926–7), 19–21, 37–41
Janáčeks Stil, Der Auftakt, vii (1927), 279–83
Janáčkova Glagolská mše, Tempo [Prague], vii (1927–8), 186–93
Hudba a ruská legie [Music and the Russian Legion], Tempo [Prague], viii (1928–9), 16–21
Václav Kaprál; Vilém Petrželka; Jaroslav Kvapil; Jan Kunc, Tempo [Prague], ix (1929–30), 318–24; x (1930–31), 47–55; xi (1932), 127–40, 176–9; xii (1932–3), 241–52
Soudobá hudební Morava [Music in present-day Moravia], Československá vlastivěda, viii (Prague, 1935), 558–65
Hudba a revoluce [Music and revolution], Dějiny světové hudby, ed. J. Branberger (Prague, 1939), 553–637
Kvapil (Prague, 1944)
Jak organizovati hudební výchovu v obnoveném státě [How to organize music education in the renewed state] (Brno, 1945)
Janáček a Klub přátel umění [Janáček and the Club of the Friends of Art] (Olomouc, 1948)
Janáčkova varhanická škola [Janáček's organ school] (Olomouc, 1948)
Chopinovy vlivy ve Smetanově klavírní tvorbě [Chopin's influence on Smetana's piano works], Musikologie, ii (1949), 11–37
Ludvík van Beethoven (Prague, 1952)
Janáčkova tvorba klavírní [Janáček's piano works], Musikologie, iii (1955), 306–29
K otázce interpretace Janáčkových děl [The interpretation of Janáček's works], Leoš Janáček a soudobá hudba: Brno 1958, 189–96; also in Sborník Janáčkovy akademie múzických umění, ii (1960), 5–18; Ger. trans. in Operní dílo Leoše Janáčka: Brno 1965, 141–4
O sovětském a našem hudebním školství [Soviet and Czech music education], HRo, xi (1958), 179–82
Beethovenovy klavírní sonáty, i (Prague, 1964)
Václav Kaprál: kapitola z historie české meziválečné hudby [A chapter in the history of Czech music between the wars] (Brno, 1968)

References

Further reading 
Vysloužil, Jiří. Ludvík Kundera : profil umělce, pedagoga a vědce. Brno : SPN, 1962. 153 p. Spisy Janáčkovy akademie múzických umění 1

External links 
prof. PhDr. Ludvík Kundera at Encyklopedie dějin města Brna 

1891 births
1971 deaths
Writers from Brno
People from the Margraviate of Moravia
Czechoslovak musicologists
Czechoslovak pianists
Academic staff of Charles University
Academic staff of the Janáček Academy of Music and Performing Arts
Academic staff of Brno Conservatory